Gandalfus is a genus of crabs belonging to the family Bythograeidae.

The species of this genus are found in Eastern Asia and Australia.

Species:

Gandalfus puia 
Gandalfus yunohana

References

Crabs
Decapod genera
Organisms named after Tolkien and his works